Maria Smith may refer to:

Maria Smith (actress), eighteenth century British actress
Maria Ann Smith (1799–1870), British-Australian fruit grower known as "Granny Smith"
Maria Geraldine Smith (born 1961), British politician

See also
Maria Smith-Falkner (1878–1968), Soviet economist and statistician 
Maria Smith Abdy

Marie Smith (disambiguation)
Maria Smythe
Mary Smith (disambiguation)